Echo Bridge Entertainment is an American independent distribution company. It acquires and distributes feature films, scripted and non-scripted series, documentaries, and children’s programming for home video, digital and television in the United States and throughout the world. Since its acquisition of Alliance Atlantis International Distribution and recent distribution partnerships with Miramax and ABC Disney/Buena Vista, Echo Bridge Entertainment had a combined portfolio of over 11,000 titles, including Degrassi: The Next Generation (a co-production with DHX Media's Epitome Pictures), until DHX Media acquired the library in November 2014.

History 
Echo Bridge Home Entertainment, a division of Echo Bridge Entertainment, was founded in 1995 as Platinum Disc Corporation. It was named and had its logo inspired from the real Echo Bridge in Massachusetts. In 2002, Platinum acquired PM Entertainment from The Harvey Entertainment Group. In 2005, Platinum Disc Corporation and Echo Bridge Entertainment merged to form Echo Bridge Home Entertainment. In 2008, Echo Bridge acquired Alliance Atlantis International Distribution. In 2011, Echo Bridge Entertainment and Miramax have made a distribution deal in which Echo Bridge will release 251 movies from the Miramax catalog, with the other 550 going to Lionsgate and StudioCanal as Miramax has a similar distribution deal with them. On March 17, 2014, after Echo Bridge lost the distribution rights to the Miramax titles, the Miramax releases all went out of print and any mention of them was removed from their website. Lionsgate later expanded their deal with Miramax to include the 251 movies previously released by Echo Bridge until 2020, when Paramount Home Entertainment (which parent company acquired a 49% stake of Miramax in 2019) extended their own deal with Miramax to include those 251 movies.

In January 2017, Producer Steven Paul purchased Echo Bridge.

Filmography 
 Platinum Disc Library
 Echo Bridge Home Entertainment Library

See also 
 Alliance Atlantis
 Miramax
 PM Entertainment
 The Asylum

References

External links 
 Official Echo Bridge/Twitter 
 Official Echo Bridge/Facebook

Companies based in Wisconsin
Mass media companies established in 1995
Home video companies of the United States
DVD companies of the United States
Film distributors of the United States
La Crosse, Wisconsin
American independent film studios